Stonglandet Church is a parish church of the Church of Norway in Senja Municipality in Troms og Finnmark county, Norway. It is located in the village of Stonglandseidet on the south side of the island of Senja. It is one of the churches for the Tranøy parish which is part of the Senja prosti (deanery) in the Diocese of Nord-Hålogaland. The white, wooden church was built in a long church style in 1896 using plans drawn up by the architect Ole Scheistrøen. The church seats about 240 people.

See also
List of churches in Nord-Hålogaland

References

Senja
Churches in Troms
Wooden churches in Norway
19th-century Church of Norway church buildings
Churches completed in 1896
1896 establishments in Norway
Long churches in Norway